Mariysky Bikshik (Mari Bikşege) is a rural locality (a village) in Novokilbakhtinsky Selsoviet, Kaltasinsky District, Bashkortostan, Russia. The population was 73 as of 2010. There are 2 streets.

Geography 
Mariysky Bikshik is located 30 km east of Kaltasy (the district's administrative centre) by road. Kuchash is the nearest rural locality.

References 

Rural localities in Kaltasinsky District